Temnopis fuscipennis is a species of beetle in the family Cerambycidae. It was described by Martins in 1978.

References

Oemini
Beetles described in 1978